Iveland is a municipality in Agder County, Norway. It is located in the traditional district of Setesdal. The administrative centre of the municipality is the village of Birketveit. Other villages in the municipality include Bakken, Skaiå, and Vatnestrøm.

The  municipality is the 279th largest by area out of the 356 municipalities in Norway. Iveland is the 308th most populous municipality in Norway with a population of 1,323.

General information
The municipality was established on 1 January 1886, when the old municipality of Hornnes og Iveland was split into two municipalities: Iveland (population 1103) and Hornnes (population 1113). The municipal boundaries have not changed since that time.

Name
The municipality (originally the parish) is named after the old Iveland farm, which is now part of Birketveit, since the first Iveland Church was built there. The first element is the genitive case of the river name Ífa (now called the Frøysåna), and the last element is land, which means "land" or "farm". The old river name is probably derived from the Norse word ýr, which means "yew" (Taxus baccata).

Coat of arms
The coat of arms was granted on 9 October 1987. The official blazon is "Vert, a hammer bendwise argent". This means the arms have a green field (background) and the charge is a stonemason's hammer. The hammer has a tincture of argent which means it is commonly colored white, but if it is made out of metal, then silver is used. The green color in the field symbolizes the importance of forestry and agriculture in the municipality. The hammer was chosen to symbolize the importance of mining in the area (such as quartz and nickel). The arms were designed by Ulf Skauge.

Churches
The Church of Norway has one parish within the municipality of Iveland. It is part of the Otredal prosti (deanery) in the Diocese of Agder og Telemark.

History
Although nothing is found in written sources about Iveland before the 15th century, there is evidence of occupation for thousands of years prior to that. Stone Age implements have been found, which are 4000–5000 years old. A King's road, which allowed horse travel, went in an east–west direction through the area and was in use as early as the 9th century, and perhaps before. But the first written record of farms created by clearing the land goes back about 600 years.

The Setesdalsbanen was a narrow-gauge steam railway built in 1896, which went across Iveland on its route between Vennesla and Byglandsfjord in Bygland. The Setesdal Line's operation was terminated in 1962, and the track was removed between Byglandsfjord and Beihølen. When it was constructed, it revived the lumber industry. Large quantities of planks, poles, and timbers were brought by horse to the Iveland station and forwarded by railroad to Kristiansand. This resulted in better prices, since it provided competition with the floated timber.

Geography
Iveland is the smallest municipality in Setesdal. The Otra river, which flows through Iveland, is the largest river in the Sørlandet district. Towards the east it borders on lake Oggevatn.

The municipality is bordered in the northwest by Evje og Hornnes, in the northeast and east by Birkenes, and in the south and west by Vennesla. The municipality has three population centers: Birketveit, Vatnestrøm, and Skaiå.

The Iveland area includes several hundred old mines. These pegmatite mines and quarries yield more than 100 different minerals, including minerals containing rare-earth elements, beryllium, scandium, uranium, and thorium.

Government
All municipalities in Norway, including Iveland, are responsible for primary education (through 10th grade), outpatient health services, senior-citizen services, unemployment and other social services, zoning, economic development, and municipal roads. The municipality is governed by a municipal council of elected representatives, which in turn elect a mayor.  The municipality falls under the Agder District Court and the Agder Court of Appeal.

Municipal council
The municipal council of Iveland is made up of 17 representatives, which are elected every 4 years. Currently, the party breakdown is as follows:

Notable people 
 Einar Iveland (1892 in Iveland – 1975) a Norwegian politician, various positions on Iveland council 1933-1950
 Anne Gerd Eieland (born 1982 in Iveland) Norway's third best female high jumper

References

External links

Municipal fact sheet from Statistics Norway 

Welcome to Iveland - Tourist information
Municipal website 

 
Municipalities of Agder
1886 establishments in Norway
Setesdal
Kristiansand region